The 1947–48 season was Real Madrid Club de Fútbol's 45th season in existence and the club's 16th consecutive season in the top flight of Spanish football.

Summary
The season is best remembered as the worst league performance by the club in its history finishing on 11th spot avoiding relegation on the last round of the season in spite of a great campaign of midfielder Luis Molowny scoring nine goals.

After three years of construction "Nuevo Chamartín" (New Chamartín Stadium) was inaugurated on 14 December 1947 with a match between Real Madrid and the Portuguese side Os Belenenses. The stadium had an initial capacity of 75,145 spectators.

Meanwhile, the club fired two managers until Michael Keeping was signed for the second part of the season improving the path for the squad included a controversial 1–1 against top-league team Atlético Madrid. The squad could reach a victory on 11 April 1948 against Real Oviedo 2–0 with a superb performance of Pruden saving Real Madrid from a relegation.

The campaign was the first with numbered shirts (measure pioneered in Europe by Arsenal F.C. since 1928) being the first match against local rivals Atlético Madrid with a 0–5 result.

After saving the category, the team was eliminated in the round of 16 of the Copa del Generalísimo by Espanyol, losing the two matches of the series.

Squad

Transfers

Competitions

La Liga

Position by round

League table

Matches

Copa del Generalísimo

Fifth round

Sixth round

Round of 16

Copa Eva Duarte

Statistics

Squad statistics

Players statistics

References

Real Madrid CF seasons
Real Madrid CF